Pioneer Coal Limited is a Canadian mining company based in Antigonish, Nova Scotia.

It was founded in 1980 by John Chisholm, owner of Nova Construction Company Limited. The company currently operates two open pit coal mines:

 Stellarton Surface Coal Mine, located in Stellarton, Nova Scotia
 Point Aconi Surface Coal Mine, located in Point Aconi, Nova Scotia

Both open-pit mines are operated as reclamation mines in areas that used to have underground mining operations. After surface mining has been completed, the land is reclaimed for other uses. The Stellarton mine is slated to cease operating in 2019.

In 2014 the company began a feasibility study to evaluate an additional surface coal mine near Springhill, Nova Scotia.

References

Coal companies of Canada
Companies based in Nova Scotia
Antigonish, Nova Scotia
Energy companies established in 1980
Non-renewable resource companies established in 1980